Ombathuveli is a village in the Papanasam taluk of Thanjavur district, Tamil Nadu, India.

Demographics 

As per the 2001 census, Ombathuveli had a total population of 1738 with 866 males and 872 females. The sex ratio was 100.7%. The literacy rate was 74.25%.

References 

 

Villages in Thanjavur district